Lake Iznik is a lake in the Province of Bursa, Turkey. It is around 32 km in length and 10 km in width with a maximum depth of about 80 m. The town of Iznik (historically known as Nicaea) lies at its eastern end.

History
In Greek mythology, during the Trojan War the region by the Lake İznik was held by the Phrygians, who sent troops to the aid of King Priam, led by the brothers Phorcys and Ascanius, sons of Aretaon as related in the Iliad.

Ascanius, son of Aretaon, should not be confused with Ascanius (son of Aeneas) or Ascanius (son of Priam), who also feature in legends of the Trojan War.

In the 1920s, the region was known for rice production.

In 2014, during aerial photography to survey the local monuments, the remains of an underwater Byzantine basilica -possibly erected in the 4th century- were identified, a discovery which was named one of the top 10 discoveries by the Archaeological Institute of America. The basilica was dedicated to St. Neophytos of Nicaea and it is thought that the effects of an earthquake which took place in A.D. 740 provoked its collapse. Plans are on the way to establish an underwater museum.

Important Bird Area
The lake, which is in unprotected status, was declared by BirdLife International as an Important Bird Area in 1989 for its waterfowl species, which are threatened through pollution and development of İznik as a recreational center.

Gallery

References

External links

Iznik
Landforms of Bursa Province
Important Bird Areas of Turkey
İznik